The 1961 IFA Shield Final was the 60th final of the IFA Shield, the second oldest football competition in India, and was contested between Kolkata giants East Bengal and Mohun Bagan on 26 September 1961 first which ended in a draw and then a replay on 27 September 1961 at the East Bengal–Mohun Bagan Ground in Kolkata respectively.

Both teams failed to score in either of the finals and were declared as joint winners. Mohun Bagan lifted their eight titles while East Bengal won their seventh IFA Shield title.

Route to the final

Match

Summary
The IFA Shield final began at the East Bengal-Mohun Bagan Ground in Kolkata on 26 September 1958 in front of a packed crowd as Kolkata giants East Bengal and Mohun Bagan faced each other in a Kolkata Derby. Mohun Bagan, the defending champions, made their fourteenth appearance in the final after they defeated Eastern Railway 2–0 in the semi-final, having won it seven times previously in 1911, 1947, 1948, 1952, 1954, 1956, and 1960. East Bengal reached their eleventh final after defeating Indian Navy 2–1 in the semi-final, having won the title six times previously in 1943, 1945, 1949, 1950, 1951, and 1958. 

Both teams tried to take control of the game but neither failed to create chances as both teams cancelled each other out. Salauddin of Mohun Bagan and Sukumar Samajpati of East Bengal got chances but failed to score as the game ended in a 0–0 draw. The IFA Shield committee decided to host the replay final the very next day.

Details

Replay

Summary
The replay final began at the East Bengal-Mohun Bagan Ground in Kolkata on 27 September 1961 after the first game ended in a 0–0 stalemate.

Mohun Bagan kicked off the match and Chuni Goswami tried a long-range effort at the very first minute which was easily collected by East Bengal custodian Abani Bose. East Bengal counter attacked in the fourth minute, but T. Rahman blocked the shot by Dharmalingam Kannan for a corner. Kannan got another opportunity in the seventeenth minute when his shot was saved by Sanath Sett and rebounded off the crossbar onto the feet of Sukumar Samajpati, whose shot again struck the crossbar and went out. In the thirty-first minute, Nilesh Sarkar once again hit the crossbar as East Bengal failed to score. The second half begun in the same way as East Bengal struck the post for the fourth time, when Kannan took a powerful shot in the thirty-eighth minute. Mohun Bagan too got some few chances in the second half but failed to score as the game ended 0–0 in regulation time. An additional fifteen minutes of extra time was played but both teams failed to break the deadlock as the game ended in a 0–0 draw. The IFA decided to declare both the teams as joint winners of the competition. Mohun Bagan captain Chuni Goswami defeated East Bengal captain Citto Chanda in the coin toss which decided that Bagan would keep the Shield for the first six months, followed by East Bengal.

Details

References

External links
IFA Shield Finals

IFA Shield finals
1961–62 in Indian football
East Bengal Club matches
Mohun Bagan AC matches
Football competitions in Kolkata